medical test is a medical procedure performed to detect, diagnose, or monitor diseases, disease processes, susceptibility, or to determine a course of treatment. The tests are classified by speciality field allowing to know in which  ward of hospital or by which specialist doctor are usually these tests performed. This list is not exhaustive but might be useful as a guide.

Where available, ICD-10 codes are listed.

Consulting Room Tests

These tests are usually performed in a consulting room by any doctor and require no advanced equipment.
 general
 Temperature measurement, with a thermometer
Patient's Respiratory rate measurement
Blood oxygen concentration measurement
 taking the patient's pulse
 weighing, and measuring height and girth
 measuring blood pressure
 specific:
 abdominal palpation
 cardiac ausculation
 HEENT examination
 digital rectal examination
 neurological examination
 psychiatric assessment
 pulmonary auscultation
 vaginal examination

Cardiovascular
 coronary catheterization
 echocardiography
 electrocardiogram
 ballistocardiogram

Dermatology
 skin allergy test
 skin biopsy

Ear, Nose and Throat
 hearing test
 laryngoscopy
 vestibular tests
 electronystagmography (ENG)
 videonystagmography (VNG)

Gastrointestinal
 capsule endoscopy
 coloscopy
 endoscopic retrograde cholangiopancreatography
 esophagogastroduodenoscopy
 esophageal motility study
 esophageal pH monitoring
 liver biopsy

Hematology
 bone marrow examination

Laboratory
 biochemistry
 Arterial blood gas (ABG)
 Complete blood count (CBC)
 Comprehensive metabolic panel (CMP) (including CHEM-7)
 coagulation tests
 C-reactive protein
 Erythrocyte sedimentation rate (ESR)
 FibroTest
 urea breath test
 urinalysis
 Agostini's reaction
 cytogenetics and Molecular Genetics
 Genetic testing
 immunology
 autoantibodies
 microbiology
 blood culture
 mantoux test
 sputum culture
 stool culture
 urine culture

Neurological
 electroencephalogram
 electromyography (EMG)
 lumbar puncture
 neuropsychological tests

Obstetric / Gynaecological
 amniocentesis
 colposcopy
mammography
 hysteroscopy
laparoscopy
 Smear tests such as Pap smears

Ocular
 dilated fundus examination
 multifocal electroretinography (mfERG)
 optical coherence tomography (OCT) 
 visual field test

Pulmonary
 polysomnography
 pulmonary pletysmography
 thoracentesis

Radiology
 CT scan (B*2****)
 magnetic resonance imaging (MRI) (B*3****)
 nuclear medicine (C******)
 positron-emission tomography (PET)
 projectional radiography (B*0****)
 ultrasonography (B*4****)

Rheumatologic
 arthroscopy

Urologic
 cystoscopy
 urodynamic testing

References

Tests
Tests